Jeneva Stevens (née McCall, born October 28, 1989) is an American track and field athlete specializing in the shot put and hammer throw. Her biggest successes to date are the gold medal at the 2013 Summer Universiade in Kazan and 9th place at the 2013 World Championships in Moscow.

She studied at Southern Illinois University.

Her father was former boxing world champion Oliver McCall.

Competition record

Personal bests
Outdoor
 Shot put – 19.11 (Carbondale 2016)
 Discus throw – 59.45 (Auburn, AL 2012)
 Hammer throw – 74.77 (Dubnica 2013)
Indoor
 Shot put – 19.10 (Carbondale, IL 2012)
 Weight throw – 23.98 (Carbondale, IL 2014)

References

 
 

1989 births
Living people
Sportspeople from Illinois
Track and field athletes from Illinois
American female hammer throwers
American female shot putters
Female weight throwers
Pan American Games track and field athletes for the United States
Athletes (track and field) at the 2015 Pan American Games
Universiade medalists in athletics (track and field)
Universiade gold medalists for the United States
World Athletics Championships athletes for the United States
Southern Illinois Salukis athletes
People from Dolton, Illinois
Sportspeople from Cook County, Illinois
Medalists at the 2013 Summer Universiade
21st-century American women